The Renault Wind was a two-seater roadster by the French automobile manufacturer Renault. The Wind was originally a concept car unveiled in September 2004 at the Paris Motor Show as a 2+1 roadster. On February 2, 2010, Renault announced that the Wind would enter production. It was unveiled at the Geneva Motor Show on March 2, 2010.

The production version was a two-seater, as opposed to the 2+1 seating of the concept car. In February 2012, Renault retired the Wind, Espace, Kangoo, Modus, and Laguna lines in the United Kingdom. For Mainland Europe, the Wind remained available until June 2013. Renault bought the rights to the Ferrari Superamerica's roof, and used it on the Wind. The boot canopy was added later.

Engine
The Wind is equipped with an I4 petrol engine: either the 1.2 litre TCE, or a 1.6 litre.

Design
The concept Wind's design is like other Renault vehicles such as the performance versions of the Clio and Mégane. The production Wind, however, is heavily based on the Twingo, evident in its overall size and stance, as well as its windscreen wiper mechanism, and also its semi-circular door handles exactly the same as those on the Twingo.

The steering wheel and pedal assemblies in the concept are adjustable and fold away automatically when the door is opened for easier access.

The Wind features a one piece metal roof which rotates 180° backwards (much like the 2005 Ferrari Superamerica), instead of being made of several pieces like many other metal roof convertibles. Renault claims that it takes twelve seconds to fold the roof away, which is comparable to most other convertibles.

Trim lines
There were three model trim lines: Dynamique, Dynamique S, and the limited edition "Collection". The Dynamique trim line was the most basic, with 16" alloy wheels and air conditioning as standard features.

The Dynamique S trim was above this, with 17" alloy wheels and climate control. The Limited Edition "Collection" trim had the biggest range of features, including a gloss black retractable roof and red and chrome dashboard inserts. In the United Kingdom, trim levels included: Dynamique, Dynamique S, GT Line, and the top of the range Collection.

Wind Concept

The Wind concept car was unveiled at the 2004 Paris Motor Show as a 2+1 roadster, and was powered by an inline 4 engine which produced 136 bhp (101 kW) and 141 lb·ft (191 N·m) of torque.

See also
 Renault Clio
 Renault Twingo

References

External links

Wind
Wind
Hardtop convertibles
Roadsters
2010s cars
Cars introduced in 2010